The 2013 Internationaux de Strasbourg was a professional tennis tournament played on clay courts. It was the 27th edition of the tournament and was part of the 2013 WTA Tour. It took place in Strasbourg, France between 18 and 25 May 2013.

Singles main draw entrants

Seeds 

 1 Rankings are as of May 13, 2013.

Other entrants 
The following players received wildcards into the singles main draw:
  Claire Feuerstein
  Caroline Garcia
  Virginie Razzano

The following players received entry from the qualifying draw:
  Marta Domachowska
  Magda Linette
  Flavia Pennetta
  Shelby Rogers

Withdrawals 
Before the tournament
  Lara Arruabarrena
  Maria Kirilenko
  Anabel Medina Garrigues
  Pauline Parmentier
  Heather Watson (mononucleosis)

Doubles main draw entrants

Seeds 

1 Rankings are as of May 13, 2013.

Other entrants 
The following pairs received wildcards into the doubles main draw:
  Claire Feuerstein /  Lara Michel
  Caroline Garcia /  Mathilde Johansson
The following pair received entry as alternates:
  Marta Domachowska /  María Teresa Torró Flor

Withdrawals 
Before the tournament
  Olga Puchkova
During the tournament
  Daniela Hantuchová (right shoulder injury)

Champions

Singles 

 Alizé Cornet def.  Lucie Hradecká,  7–6(7–4), 6–0

Doubles 

 Kimiko Date-Krumm /  Chanelle Scheepers def.  Cara Black /  Marina Erakovic, 6–4, 3–6, [14–12]

References

External links 
 Official website

Internationaux de Strasbourg
Internationaux de Strasbourg
2013 in French tennis
May 2013 sports events in France